Celestina Stefania Popa-Toma (born 12 July 1970) is a retired Romanian artistic gymnast, who competed internationally between 1985 and 1988. She is an Olympic silver medalist and a world gold and silver medalist with the team. She is best known for her eponymous straddle pike jump with full turn on floor as well as for her flexibility and style.

Career
In 1984 Popa placed second at the Romanian Junior Nationals and she became a member of the national team. In 1985 she was a member of the silver medal winning team at the 1985 World Championships. Also in 1985, she was the all around champion, vault and beam gold medalist at the International Chunichi Cup in Japan.

Together with Aurelia Dobre, Camelia Voinea, Eugenia Golea, Daniela Silivaș and Ecaterina Szabo, Popa was a member of the gold medal winning team at the 1987 World Championships in Rotterdam, The Netherlands. In 1988 she won the silver medal with the team at the Olympics and placed tenth all around in the preliminaries.

Eponymous skill
Popa has one eponymous skill listed in the Code of Points.

Post retirement
After retiring from competitions in 1989 she studied at a sport school in Bucharest until 1991, and in 1994 graduated from university with a degree in physical education. She hold the National Romanian Coaching Certification Level III. Popa has been coaching since 1991, and since 1994 she has been a recreational coach at Flicka Gymnastics in North Vancouver, British Columbia, Canada. She is married to fellow former Romanian gymnast Flaviu Toma, who was a longtime head coach and technical director at Flicka. In 2009, she opened her own gym "Celestina Popa Gymnastics" in Maple Ridge, British Columbia, Canada.

References

External links

 
 
 
 List of competitive results at gymn-forum.net
 Celestina Popa Gymnastics

1970 births
Living people
Sportspeople from Ploiești
Romanian female artistic gymnasts
Gymnasts at the 1988 Summer Olympics
Olympic gymnasts of Romania
Olympic silver medalists for Romania
Olympic medalists in gymnastics
Medalists at the World Artistic Gymnastics Championships
Originators of elements in artistic gymnastics
Romanian gymnastics coaches
Medalists at the 1988 Summer Olympics